Notable oud makers include:

In Morocco:
 Samir Abbassi (Casablanca)
 Khalid Belhaiba (Casablanca)
 abdessalam Chiki (Fès)

In Saudi Arabia:  mohammed bin yahya (Jizan)In Israel: Peter sabagh
 Khatem Jubran
 Yaron Naor
 Ibrahim abu romaneh
Netanel cohenIn Iraq: Ahmed al-Abdali
 Farhan HassanIn Syria: Abdo Nahat (Damascus)
 Georges Hayek (Aleppo)
 Michel Khaouam (Aleppo)
 Sumbat DerBedrosian (Damascus)
 Hanna Nahaat
 Ali Khalefa (Syria)
 Amr and Ali (Aleppo)In Greece: Dimitris RapakousiosIn France: Sylvain Bouancheau Dugast (Nantes)In Turkey: Faruk Turunz (Istanbul)
 Yıldırım Palabıyık (İzmir)
 Emir Degirmenli (Ankara)In Lebanon: Nazih Ghadban - Ras Baalbek
 Albert Mansour - Beirut
 Fadi Matta - Zouk Mikael
 Georges Bitar 
 Rabih Haddad - Zahley
 Yasser AbouChakra - Ammatour El ChoufIn The United States: Viken Najarian (California)
 John Vergara (New York)In The United Kingdom:'
 Jo Dusepo

References

oud
oud